Leo Austin Brooks Jr. (born August 15, 1957) is a retired brigadier general of the United States Army. The Brooks family is noted for its military accolades and public service, as his brother is army General Vincent K. Brooks and their father Leo A. Brooks Sr. was a major general in the United States Army. His uncle, Francis K. Brooks, was the majority leader of the Vermont House of Representatives and a member of the Vermont Senate.

Education
Brooks attended Sacramento's Jesuit High School in 1975. He then graduated from the United States Military Academy at West Point with a Bachelor of Science degree in 1979 and later earned a Master of Public Administration degree from the University of Oklahoma in 1990. He is currently a Senior Fellow at the Maxwell School of Government at Syracuse University as well as a Trustee at Norwich University.

Decorations and awards
Brooks' awards and decorations include the Army Distinguished Service Medal, Legion of Merit with two oak leaf clusters, Defense Meritorious Service Medal, Meritorious Service Medal with four oak leaf clusters, Army Commendation Medal, Army Achievement Medal with two oak leaf clusters, and Multinational Force and Observers Medal. He is authorized to wear the Expert Infantryman Badge, Ranger Tab, Master Parachutist Badge, Pathfinder Badge and Air Assault Badge.

Quotes
 "Building a moral and ethical environment is what you have to do to create character in your work world. You have to create leadership that will become trustworthy."

References

External links
 INTERVIEW: General Leo Brooks, West Point Commandant
 Brigadier General Leo Brooks Jr. to speak at Norwich
 Operation Racial Preferences
 Leadership Today
 Army Salutes Its Black Veterans

1958 births
African-American United States Army personnel
United States Army generals
Living people
United States Military Academy alumni
Commandants of the Corps of Cadets of the United States Military Academy
Recipients of the Legion of Merit
Military personnel from Anchorage, Alaska
People from Sacramento, California
Military personnel from Alexandria, Virginia
21st-century African-American people
20th-century African-American people
Military personnel from California